Oconee is a city in Washington County, Georgia, United States. The population was 280 at the 2000 census.

History
The city's name derives from the Oconee people (also known as the Hitchiti), a Muskogean-speaking tribe who inhabited central Georgia at time of contact with European-American settlers. The Oconee lived in present-day Baldwin County, Georgia at a settlement known as Oconee Old Town, later moving to the Chattahoochee River in the early 18th century. The name exists in several variations, including Ocone, Oconi, Ocony, and Ekwoni. 

The city of Oconee was named after the river that bears the tribe's name. It was founded in the early 1840s, when the railroad was extended to that point. 

The Georgia General Assembly incorporated Oconee as a town in 1876.

Notable natives
 Berry Gordy Sr. and wife, Bertha Fuller Gordy, the parents of legendary music producer and Motown founder Berry Gordy Jr., left Oconee in 1922.

Geography

Oconee is located at  (32.856310, -82.954316).

Demographics

As of the census of 2000, there were 280 people, 94 households, and 67 families living in the city. The racial makeup of the city was 61.79% White, 36.43% African American, and 1.79% from two or more races.

There were 94 households, out of which 21.3% had children under the age of 18 living with them, 55.3% were married couples living together, 14.9% had a female householder with no husband present, and 27.7% were non-families. 25.5% of all households were made up of individuals, and 12.8% had someone living alone who was 65 years of age or older.  The average household size was 2.45 and the average family size was 2.93.

In the city, the population was spread out, with 16.1% under the age of 18, 9.3% from 18 to 24, 19.3% from 25 to 44, 25.7% from 45 to 64, and 29.6% who were 65 years of age or older.  The median age was 48 years. For every 100 females, there were 84.2 males.  For every 100 females age 18 and over, there were 82.2 males.

The median income for a household in the city was $41,250, and the median income for a family was $43,750. Males had a median income of $32,500 versus $12,344 for females. The per capita income for the city was $13,262.  About 17.2% of families and 33.2% of the population were below the poverty line, including 17.9% of those under the age of eighteen and 53.1% of those 65 or over.

See also

Central Savannah River Area

References

Cities in Georgia (U.S. state)
Cities in Washington County, Georgia